Sunira is a genus of moths of the family Noctuidae. Sunira was treated as a subgenus of Agrochola by Ronkay et al. in 2001, but is still treated as a valid genus by Brian Pitkin et al. at Butterflies and Moths of the World (as of 2005) and at All-Leps (as of 2009).

If treated as a valid genus, it contains the following species:
Sunira bicolorago (Guenée, 1852)
Sunira decipiens (Grote, 1881)
Sunira verberata (Smith, 1904)

References

Natural History Museum Lepidoptera genus database

Noctuinae